Thornton Street ferry wharf was a ferry terminal located on the southern side of the Brisbane River serving the Brisbane suburb of Kangaroo Point in Queensland, Australia. It was served by Transdev Brisbane Ferries' CityHopper service and the cross-river service to Eagle Street Pier in the Brisbane central business district. These services were suspended in July 2020 and the wharf was permanently closed in October 2020.

History 
The wharf sustained moderate damage during the January 2011 Brisbane floods. It reopened after repairs on 14 February 2011.

In Popular Culture
This ferry terminal was used as a filming location during Season 3 of the Australian Crime Drama  Harrow. It had already closed to the public by the time it was used for filming.

References

External links

Ferry wharves in Brisbane
Kangaroo Point, Queensland